Quanta is the plural of quantum.

Quanta may also refer to:

Organisations 

 Quanta Computer, a Taiwan-based manufacturer of electronic and computer equipment
 Quanta Display Inc., a Taiwanese TFT-LCD panel manufacturer acquired by AU Optronics
 QUANTA, a user group for the Sinclair QL computer
 Quanta Services, a US-based speciality contractor for the electric, gas, and telecommunications industries
 Quanta Technology, a utility infrastructure consulting company

Technology

 Quanta, an algorithm for random number generation for smart contracts
 Quanta Plus, a web development tool

Music

 Quanta, a 1997 album by Gilberto Gil
 Quanta Live, a Grammy Award-winning 1998 album by Gilberto Gil

Science

 Quanta (journal), an open-access academic journal
 Quanta Magazine, a magazine covering developments in science

Others

 A line of bowling balls by Brunswick Bowling & Billiards
 Quanta cura, a papal encyclical issued by Pope Pius IX on 8 December 1864